"Age of Apocalypse" is a 1995 comic book crossover storyline mostly published in the X-Men franchise of books by Marvel Comics. The Age of Apocalypse briefly replaced the universe of Earth-616 and had ramifications in the main Marvel Comics universe when the original timeline was restored. It was later retconned as having occurred in the alternate universe of Earth-295.

During the entirety of the Age of Apocalypse event the regularly published X-Men comics were replaced by new X-Men related mini series, focusing on various teams and individuals in the Age of Apocalypse world including X-Calibre, Gambit and the X-Ternals, Generation Next, Astonishing X-Men, Amazing X-Men, Weapon X, Factor X, X-Man and X-Universe. The event was bookended by two one shots, X-Men Alpha and X-Men Omega.

The storyline starts with Legion (David Haller), a psychotic mutant who traveled back in time to kill Magneto before he can commit various crimes against humanity. Legion accidentally kills Professor Charles Xavier, his father, leading to a major change in the timeline. The death of Professor Xavier leads Apocalypse to attack 10 years sooner than he did in the original timeline, taking control of Earth and altering everything that happened from that point forward. Apocalypse is opposed by several factions of mutant resistance, including a group led by Magneto. The group manages to send the mutant Bishop back in time to prevent the murder of Professor Xavier, undoing the entire timeline.

In 2005, Marvel published an Age of Apocalypse one-shot and miniseries to celebrate the 10th anniversary of the fan favorite event. The book looks at what happened after the end of the original story, revealing that the timeline became in fact an alternate earth, designated "Earth-295". The "Dark Angel Saga" in 2011 revisited the alternate reality once more, leading to an Age of Apocalypse ongoing series launched in 2012 that ran for 14 issues. The world was also featured as part of Marvel's 2015 Secret Wars.

Storyline

Legion (David Haller), a psychotic mutant on Earth and son of Professor Charles Xavier, travels back in time with the intention of killing Magneto (Erik Lehnsherr). However, Legion travels to a time when Magneto and Xavier are still friends while in Israel. As Xavier dies trying to protect Magneto, Legion vanishes, and a new timeline is created. The only person aware of how history has changed is Lucas Bishop, a time traveling mutant who followed Legion.

Because of Xavier's sacrifice, Magneto comes to believe in his late friend's dream of a peaceful coexistence between humans and mutants. Apocalypse (En Sabah Nur), an immortal mutant villain, was monitoring the fight. He chooses this moment as the perfect time to begin his world conquest, which did not happen in the mainstream Marvel universe for another ten years.

Magneto assembles the X-Men just as Apocalypse begins his war. Despite the X-Men's resistance, Apocalypse conquers all of North America and eventually mutants are considered the ruling class. Apocalypse initiates a genocidal campaign called "cullings," killing millions of humans. To further ensure that no one is left to challenge him or undo the circumstances that led to his reign, he has everyone with telepathic or chronal abilities hunted down. Meanwhile, the changes in the timeline result in a destructive crystallization wave created by the M'Kraan Crystal.

X-Men: Alpha
X-Men: Alpha was published in January 1995 and launched the "Age of Apocalypse" crossover story. It briefly shows readers how many popular X-Men characters have changed in this new world. Bishop is reunited with Magneto while retaining fragmented memories of the true timeline. Magneto assigns his X-Men and their allies various missions. Some are to gather the forces needed to change history while others will continue resisting Apocalypse. The story continues in eight interlocking miniseries, each focusing on a different team of X-Men or other mutant forces. Each miniseries temporarily replaced one of the monthly X-Men titles being published at the time.

X-Calibre
X-Calibre is a team built around Nightcrawler (Kurt Wagner), who is sent by Magneto to locate Destiny (Irene Adler), a mutant capable of seeing into the future, so that she can verify Bishop's story. Nightcrawler must travel to Avalon, a secret refuge where mutants and humans live together in peace. Along his journey, he encounters John Proudstar (Thunderbird), the monk Cain, the pirate Callisto, and his mother Mystique (Raven Darkholme). The chief antagonists for Nightcrawler's journey consist of the Pale Riders, a trio of Apocalypse's servants made up of Moonstar (Danielle Moonstar), Damask (Emma Steed), Dead Man Wade (Wade Wilson) and the Shadow King (Amahl Farouk). Nightcrawler's team consists of Mystique, Switchback, and later Damask, who joins Nightcrawler after realizing the beauty Avalon has to offer. The X-Calibre series gets its name from an in-joke between Nightcrawler and his mother, Mystique, because of the caliber of bullets she uses, simply stamped with an X. This title replaced Excalibur.

Gambit and the X-Ternals
Gambit (Remy LeBeau)'s X-Ternals consist of Sunspot (Roberto de Costa), Jubilee (Jubilation Lee), Strong Guy (Guido Carosella) and Lila Cheney. They are sent deep into space using Lila's teleportation in order to retrieve a shard of the M'Kraan Crystal, essential to the verification of Bishop's alternate reality. The X-Ternals are pursued by Rictor, a henchman of Apocalypse desperate to earn his master's praise by killing Gambit. Upon reaching Shi'ar space, the X-ternals fight the Imperial Guard in order to retrieve the crystal shard. Upon their return to Earth, Strong Guy betrays the team, not only stealing the M'Kraan Crystal, but also kidnapping Magneto's son, Charles. This title replaced X-Force.

Generation Next
Generation Next consists of a young group of mutant students trained by the husband and wife team of Colossus (Piotr "Peter" Rasputin) and Shadowcat (Katherine Pryde-Rasputin). They consist of Chamber (Jonothan "Jono" Starsmore), Husk (Paige Guthrie), Mondo, Vincente Cimetta, and Skin (Angelo Espinoza). They are sent by Magneto into the Seattle Core to rescue Colossus' sister, Illyana Rasputin, who is the last surviving transdimensional teleporter. Illyana Rasputin is a slave of the Sugar Man, one of Apocalypse's prefects and ruler of the Seattle Core. Mondo finds Illyana Rasputin and hides her inside of his body, intending to smuggle her out at shift change. When Mondo is found out, the ensuing fight finds the Sugar Man killing Mondo with a blast from his tongue, exposing the rest of Generation Next. While fighting a near hopeless battle, Generation Next is left for dead by Colossus, who sacrifices them in order to save his sister. This title replaced Generation X.

Astonishing X-Men
The Astonishing X-Men are led by Rogue (Anna Marie Lehnsherr, Magneto's wife) and consist of Sabretooth (Victor Creed), Blink (Clarice Ferguson), Wild Child (Kyle Gibney), Morph (Kevin Sydney) and Sunfire (Shiro Yoshida). They are sent by Magneto to stop the cullings, which are being undertaken by Holocaust, Apocalypse's son and one of his horsemen. While helping with the evacuation and protection of humans, Sabretooth asks Blink to teleport him to Holocaust's location, which she reluctantly does. Sabretooth and Holocaust fight a vicious duel but Sabretooth is defeated and seemingly killed, horrifying Blink. (Sabretooth had rescued Blink from Mr. Sinister and she had come to see him as her dearest friend and mentor.) The team then fights Holocaust and his Infinites, destroying his factory. However, Holocaust manages to escape and the team returns to Xavier's mansion, where Rogue learns that both her son and her husband have been captured. Sabretooth is revealed by Iceman to have survived the battle, to Blink's delight. This title replaced The Uncanny X-Men.

Amazing X-Men
The Amazing X-Men consist of team leader Quicksilver (Pietro Lehnsherr) and Storm (Ororo Munroe), Dazzler (Alison Blaire), Banshee (Sean Cassidy), Iceman (Robert "Bobby" Drake), and Exodus (Paris Bennet). The team is sent to Maine by Magneto to aid in the evacuation of humanity to Europe. During this mission, the team fights Apocalypse's Brotherhood of Chaos, as well as the Horseman Abyss, who is defeated (but not killed) by Quicksilver. During their absence from the Xavier Mansion, Magneto and Bishop are attacked by Apocalypse himself, who captures them both. Fulfilling their mission, Quicksilver splits up his team to help the other X-Men: sending Iceman to rendezvous with Rogue's team (the Astonishing X-Men) and Dazzler and Exodus to find Magneto's son, Charles. Finally, Quicksilver, Storm, and Banshee go to rescue Bishop, who is in the hands of the Madri, Apocalypse's priests. This title replaced X-Men.

Weapon X
Weapon X (Logan) and his lover Jean Grey are depicted in this series carrying out missions for the Human High Council. Jean and Weapon X drift apart, as the Human High Council intends to launch a nuclear strike on the U.S. as Jean is appalled by the loss of life it would cause. After Weapon X concludes a battle with Donald Pierce, Jean leaves to help evacuate the U.S., bidding a tearful farewell to Logan. Weapon X is then sent to recruit Gateway, whose teleportation ability is necessary to bring the fleet to America. As the fleet leaves, Weapon X decides to join them, if only to find Jean somewhere in America before the bombs are dropped. This title temporarily replaced Wolverine.

Factor X
Factor X consists of the Elite Mutant Force (EMF), who serve Apocalypse. They are split into five sibling groups: Cyclops and Havok (Scott Summers and Alex Summers), Emplate and the Twins (Marius, Nicole, and Claudette St. Croix), Cannonball and Amazon (Sam and Elizabeth Guthrie), the Bedlam Brothers (Jesse and Terrence Aaronson), and Aurora and Northstar (Jean-Marie and Jean-Paul Beaubier). The EMF is tasked with maintaining control of Apocalypse's breeding pens, where people are imprisoned, tortured, and experimented on by the Beast, also a member of the EMF. Havok, jealous of his brother's leadership role, discovers that Cyclops is a traitor who has been helping people escape the pens; and in one such escape attempt, both Aurora and Northstar are seriously injured. Havok then exposes Cyclops and attempts to kill him, but Cyclops escapes with the aid of Jean Grey, who has arrived to evacuate as many people as she can before the Human High Council's nuclear strike. The Bedlam Brothers also choose to side with Cyclops, and they successfully defeat both Amazon and Cannonball. Cyclops and Jean defeat Havok, and as they lead the freed prisoners out of the pens, Havok is determined to kill his brother. This title replaced X-Factor.

X-Man
The protagonist of X-Man is Nate Grey, a mutant born of Cyclops' and Jean Grey's DNA, and the most powerful telekinetic in the world. He lives under the guidance of his father figure Forge, who leads a group of outcasts consisting of Mastermind, Toad, Brute, and Sauron, who attack trains and factories of Apocalypse while masquerading as a theatre troupe. This title replaced Cable.

Characters and affiliations

Mutant heroes
The only then-existing major mutant character missing in the original Age of Apocalypse is Psylocke. When the "Age of Apocalypse" storyline was revisited a decade later, she appeared in X-Men: Age of Apocalypse #4 in Asian form. Her origin remains unknown. There has been no explanation of what she was doing during the original Age of Apocalypse, other than the fact that she had some kind of past connection with Weapon X.

Other anti-Apocalypse forces
Besides the X-Men and its many offshoots, the Human High Council remains as the only other power opposing Apocalypse. Unlike the X-Men, however, the Human High Council considers the extermination of mutants as a viable option. Bolivar and Moira Trask, as well as Brian Braddock, are the major proponents for a mutant holocaust. Secretly, the Human High Council supports the Human Underground Resistance.

X-Universe also reveals the fate of several other individuals.  Peter Parker was executed because he was a potential contact for Gwen Stacy.  T'Challa and Namor perished when Wakanda and Atlantis were attacked by Apocalypse.  Frank Castle went missing following a mutant raid on a Buddhist temple where he had sought peace after the death of his family.  Reed Richards and Johnny Storm sacrificed themselves in the evacuation of Manhattan Island.

Apocalypse's agents

Neutrals

Timeline escapees
Some characters escaped the Age of Apocalypse into the Earth-616 continuity. These include Dark Beast, Nate Grey (the Age of Apocalypse version of Cable), Holocaust and Sugar Man.

 Nate Grey allied himself with the X-Men a few times and once with Spider-Man. He later "died" by disseminating into every life form on the Earth, but has since returned to the living and is now residing in San Francisco and is part of the New Mutants roster.
 Blink escaped into the multiverse and ended up leading the reality-hopping team of heroes known as the Exiles. Her counterpart on Earth-616 was thought to have died during the "Phalanx Covenant" storyline, but brought back from the dead by Selene during the "Necrosha" event.
 Prophet was taken at Jean Grey's request to the Earth-616 at the end of the crossover that would close the Age of Apocalypse timeline from the timestream.

Former timeline escapees
 Holocaust remained at large in the main Marvel Universe until he joined the Exiles and was killed by another universe's evil version of Hyperion.
 Sabretooth survived through the same means as Blink and joined a team of reality-hopping super beings known as Weapon X. During one mission, he opted to stay behind on to raise David Richards. Eventually, he was brought back into action and joined the Exiles. He has since returned to the Age of Apocalypse.
 Hatchet-9, the only surviving Mecha-Mutate officer of Assault-Regiment Delta, a regiment of traitor humans who traded limbs and more for the power and privilege of serving the High Lord Apocalypse.
 Rastus, a heavily two-headed mutated creation of Sugar Man and one of many wardens of Seattles' Core, was also revealed to have escaped to Earth-616. He joined Sugar Man and lived in the catacombs underneath the island nation of Genosha until he was accidentally discovered by the Dark Beast. He was eventually killed by Callisto.
 Wild Child left this timeline when a time-traveler, Quentin Quire, saved him from the Friends of Humanity and then used Wild Child to replace the latter's counterpart, who had recently died. Wild Child was later returned to the Age of Apocalypse and subsequently killed in battle.
 Nightcrawler decided to stay on Earth-616 after the events of the Dark Angel Saga. He joined the X-Force team so he could search for Iceman, Blob, Dark Beast and Sugar Man. He then tracked and killed his former teammates Iceman and Blob. During the X-Termination crossover, Nightcrawler apparently gave his own life to close the Age of Apocalypse timeline from the Timestream.
 Blob left the Age of Apocalypse due to the events put in motion by Archangel. He later joined Daken's Brotherhood with the apparent goal of exacting revenge on X-Force. He was killed by the AoA Nightcrawler who teleported a shark inside Blob's body.
 Iceman was revealed to have defected from the X-Men and was working for Weapon Omega. He also left the Age of Apocalypse through the same means as Blob and was tracked down by Wolverine, Deadpool, and the AoA Nightcrawler. During the fight, Nightcrawler teleported to a factory and fought Iceman, defeating him without either man using their powers. Once Iceman was defeated, Nightcrawler threw his body into an incinerator.
 Beast was sent twenty years into Earth-616's past. This allowed for several retcons which were used to explain that he (now known as Dark Beast) was responsible for the creation of the Morlocks and also why Mister Sinister initiated the "Mutant Massacre", as he recognized his stolen handiwork and ordered it exterminated as a debasement of his art. He later came under the employment of Norman Osborn's Dark X-Men, with the responsibility of keeping his counterpart and Charles Xavier captive while Osborn carried out his plan. He then returned to the Age of Apocalypse timeline and helped Weapon Omega on his quest to control America, but at the end Weapon Omega was defeated and Dark Beast was taken back to Earth-616. He was thought to be deceased, after apparently dying in a bomb explosion after progressively suffering from fatal health problems due to his own further experimentations on himself. During the 2017 Secret Empire storyline, Dark Beast turns up alive and healthy but is eventually killed by Magik.
Sugar Man was also sent twenty years into Earth-616's past, and it was through him the Genegineer received the advanced genetic research to allow the small nation of Genosha to become powerful by enslaving mutants. He remained at large in the main Marvel Universe and only a few knew about his existence. Sugar Man returned to the Age of Apocalypse timeline after being released from Steve Rogers' custody by Dark Beast, and was believed to remain there at the end of the crossover that would close the Age of Apocalypse timeline. But it was revealed that he had returned to the main reality before the event and was thought to be deceased at the hands of Magneto, only to reappear alive and planning to send six hundred mutant embryos to the future. He was later killed by a mysterious assailant who was hunting down the former Age of Apocalypse residents.

Prequels
Before the tenth anniversary, the Age of Apocalypse was considered a dead reality that no longer existed—a fact that was frequently mentioned by timeline escapees, such as Sugar Man and Blink. However, there were quite a few prequels written that took place before its destruction.

By the Light told the story of Blink transporting the X-Men to the moon where they faced Apocalypse's new horseman of Death, Maximus the Mad. Sinister Bloodlines followed the return of a Brood-infected Christopher Summers (Corsair) to Earth and his reunion, after escaping the experimentations of Sinister and Dark Beast, with Scott and Alex.

Blink was a four issue miniseries intended to reintroduce the Age of Apocalypse version of Blink as a teaser to the Exiles ongoing series. This story takes place prior to the "Age of Apocalypse" main events, but is largely set in the Negative Zone. Blink becomes lost in the Negative Zone after attempting to incite Blastaar towards war with Apocalypse and instead joins a rebellion against Blastaar alongside her lover, who turns out to be a de-evolved version of Annihilus. The last four pages of the final issue show Blink during the destruction of the Age of Apocalypse and becoming unhinged from time.

X-Man, during its run, occasionally re-visited the Age of Apocalypse, both through time travel and flashbacks. X-Man #-1 shows Mr. Sinister releasing Nate from his growth vat as a child to check on his progress. In the 1996 X-Man Annual, Sugar Man uses a variation on a time machine powered by Nate's psionic force to return to the early years of Apocalypse's rule where he hopes to take control himself. Nate follows and meets up with Forge, Magneto, Morph, and Mastermind, and is surprised to discover that Forge knew that he would be there because an older Nate Grey had time traveled and told Forge about his memories of this event. On the orders of this older Nate Grey, Forge forces the younger Nate to re-power the machine and return himself and Sugar Man to Earth-616. This leads to a rift between Forge and Magneto, who believed they should have allowed Nate to stay so that he could help them fight Apocalypse. Later, in X-Man #53 and #54, Nate, Jean Grey, and Cyclops run across a temporal rift that brings an infinite processing plant to Earth-616.

Age of Apocalypse 10th Anniversary

In 2005, Marvel published an Age of Apocalypse one-shot and miniseries to celebrate the 10th anniversary of the fan favorite event.

The one-shot features stories set before the events depicted in the original "Age of Apocalypse" event, similar in focus to the Tales from the Age of Apocalypse issues. The one-shot contains the story of how Colossus and Shadowcat left the X-Men to train Generation Next; how Sabretooth met Wild Child; the first appearance of the Silver Samurai; and how the world survived the Human High Council's nuclear attack.

The limited series, which takes place after the nuclear attack in X-Men: Omega, introduced several characters who were not in the original storyline. Long time characters Cloak and Dagger, Psylocke, and the Morlocks (including Feral, Leech, Marrow, Skids, and Thornn), who were survivors of Mr. Sinister's experiments, are introduced. Newer characters Beak, Icarus, and X-23 are seen along with an alternate version of Xorn. Jean Grey is also revealed to have saved everyone from the nuclear attack by tapping into the Phoenix Force-level powers, and is revived from death by Sinister.

Dark Angel Saga
In 2011, the Age of Apocalypse was featured in a storyline in the ongoing series Uncanny X-Force 11–18 by Rick Remender.

Seeking a Celestial 'Life Seed' in order to save Angel (Warren Worthington) from becoming the new Apocalypse, The Uncanny X-Force, under the guidance of Dark Beast, journey to the Age of Apocalypse. X-Force arrives ten years after the X-Men had defeated Mister Sinister, yet it seems the X-Men still face enormous challenges in this harsh setting. The world, which during the previous appearance had seemed to be on the road to recovery, has once again fallen on hard times, similar to when Apocalypse was ruling, with Sentinels now roaming the streets. As they follow Dark Beast to one of his labs, they are unknowingly followed by Wildchild and Sabretooth (Earth-295). Dark Beast finds the life seed but before he could hand it over to the X-Force members, Nightcrawler teleports in and swipes the seed away, figuring that Dark Beast was up to some evil plot after decades of absence. After a brief quarrel which ended with the life seed destroyed by Sunfire, Psylocke recognizes Sabretooth from her time on the Exiles and convinces Wolverine (Earth-616) that this version of Sabretooth isn't a bad guy, which ends their battle. With the life seed destroyed, Dark Beast sneaks over to the portal back to the 616 Marvel Universe and walks in, leaving X-Force stranded in the Age of Apocalypse world. Nightcrawler's team, realizing that the sentinels are descending on their position, evacuates along with X-Force, taking them to the X-Men's new base in Atlantis.

It was soon revealed that a new "Heir of Apocalypse" has risen and that's the reason why the world as fallen once again into a Dark Age that resulted on the apparent extinction of the human race. Using a version of M.O.D.O.K., they discover the body of the slain Celestial which apparently still contains life seeds. However, as X-Force also learn that the only way to return to the main reality is to seek the help of Gateway who in turn is kept prisoner in the mysterious floating city known as The Sky, the Sentinels soon arrives at Atlantis forcing the group to abandon the complex. As Fantomex leads a small team to the place where the Celestial is, the rest of the team invades The Sky to retrieve Gateway, however they are confronted by the Black Legion consisting of Earth-295 Blob, Earth-295 Manphibian, Demon Ock (a demonic creature with mechanical tentacles), Beta-Red (a female counterpart of Omega Red), Grimm Chamber (a Thing/Chamber hybrid), Iron Ghost (a Ghost Rider/Iron Man hybrid), Orange Hulk (a solar-powered Hulk), White Cloak (a Cloak/Dagger hybrid), and Zombie Sentry (an undead version of Sentry). During the fight, X-Force and the Earth-295 X-Men run into the long thought deceased Weapon X (Logan/Wolverine Earth-295). He appears using Apocalypse armor and reveals himself to be the Heir of Apocalypse.

Meanwhile, unaware of the problems Wolverine and his team are facing in the fortress, Fantomex and his small crew dive into the heart of the deceased Celestial in order to get the life seed they need to free Warren. After battling some drones, they manage to find only one seed and flee with it, losing Gambit in the battle, while, back in the fortress, Wolverine and his crew try to battle Weapon X and the Black Legion. However, Weapon X proves too powerful, since he had been augmented by the Celestial technology, when the cosmic entities came to judge planet Earth, and while he had ascended in form and power, his mind had become so twisted to the point of creating genetic-powerful warriors to kill Charles Lehnsherr, the infant son of Magneto and Rogue. Weapon X easily manages to swat them all and take Jean Grey so he could transform her into Death, a horseman of Apocalypse. To perform the ritual he approaches Storm who was enslaved and transform into a blind seer made of living stone. After taking out the Black Legion and freeing Gateway, Wolverine ask Gateway to open a portal to bring forth Fantomex team. Using Fantomex, they manage to free Jean and open a gateway to their world. Wolverine wants Jean to come too but she refuses and forces them through the gateway with her powers. As X-Force returns to their world, they are greeted by Dark Beast, the Horsemen of Apocalypse, and Archangel, now wearing Apocalypse's armor.

After a long fight, Fantomex retreats and gets Gateway to teleport the AOA X-Men to help X-Force, together they defeat Archangel, the AoA X-Men decide to go back to their timeline while Nightcrawler decides to stay in this timeline and vows to kill, Dark Beast, Iceman, Sugar Man, and any other villain that escaped the AOA timeline to this one.

Age of Apocalypse ongoing series

Publishing history
In the Marvel Point One one-shot, a new team of anti-mutant humans calling themselves the X-Terminated, pledged to combat the rule of the ascended Weapon X and his minions, after X-Force's attempt to stop the genocidal successor of Apocalypse. The group consisted of remaining members of the human race in the Age of Apocalypse who have been pushed to the edge of extinction by mutants. Members of that team were Prophet (William Stryker), Goodnight (a rebuilt Donald Pierce), Deadeye (Zora Risman), Fiend (Francesca Trask), and Horror Show (Graydon Creed).

Plot summary
As Jean Grey and Sabretooth returned from Earth-616, they meet the human coalition. It is also revealed that Jean had ordered much to Magneto's horror, the creation of clones of the Scarlet Witch, so they could use the spell Jean saw previously on Wolverine's mind that de-powered 99% of mutantkind. However Weapon X and his Black Legion attack the last human city where Weapon X himself slays both Magneto and Rogue, leaving Jean Grey and Sabretooth the last two X-Men alive (Sunfire had given his life to stop Archangel's plans on Earth-616, and Nightcrawler decided to stay on that reality to hunt down Dark Beast, Blob, Iceman and Sugar Man). Jean telepathically nudges clones of the Scarlet Witch to recreate the Decimation and remove all mutants' powers across the globe. However, this was only successful within a radius of 12 feet, so Jean Grey and Sabretooth are both left de-powered while Weapon X and his forces remained powered. The human coalition distracts Weapon X with a bomb long enough for the group to escape as the city explodes behind them.

As the human coalition (X-Terminated Team, now including Jean Grey) continues to fight the forces of Weapon X, now renamed Weapon Omega, they find Harper Simmons, a human journalist from Earth-616 who was forced to come to the Age of Apocalypse while investigating the prison break of Sugar Man by Dark Beast on Earth-616. He creates a pamphlet that incites human and mutant riots against Weapon Omega, who is now bringing back deceased mutants like Emplate, Scott Summers and Alex Summers using energies siphoned from the celestial life seed. Harper Simons joins with the X-Terminated. Others who work with the X-Terminated are Doctor Moreau and Bolivar Trask.

After discovering the resurrected Penance, he ordered his servants Azazel, Cyclops and Colossus to bring her into the fold. She initially refused and undid Colossus' brainwashing causing him to abandon Weapon Omega and serve Penance. A fight broke out but Azazel agreed to leave. He returned with Weapon Omega who demanded that Penance kneel before him which she did. Unbeknownst to Weapon Omega however Penance was also making deals with the Human Resistance.

It has since been revealed that when the Celestials had come to Earth, they tried to resurrect Apocalypse by rewrite his genetic code to form a new body. After a small team of X-Men went investigate the ship they discovered that Apocalypse was already in the form of a child which Weapon X effectively kills despite Jean's pleas. With the death of the child, Weapon X took on the role of the Evolutionary Caretaker in an effort to spare his world from the Celestials wrath. Thus, he restarted the campaigns of extermination perpetrated by Apocalypse against the human race after being corrupted by the Seed.

The X-Terminated later travel to Latveria so they could get the information they need to defeat Weapon Omega, as Doom had apparently managed to create a device capable of storing the Death Seed's powers which they aptly referred to as the "Apocalypse Force" from its host body and empowering it within a new user, however they are approached by the Queen, actually Doom's wife and former member of the Human High Council, Emma Frost, who had her telepathic powers returned to her and was now in league with Weapon Omega. The X-Terminated eventually gained the information they needed by killing Doom and removed the intel literally from his head.

With the information they gained, the X-Terminated build the device, however, Weapon Omega after being alerted that Jean Grey was hiding out in the city, resolved to hunt his wife down himself, and vowed that if her humanity could not be cured, he would kill her himself. Jean Grey was ultimately responsible for removing the power of the Death Seed within her former lover and were absorbed by Jean as the next host. Thanks to her history with the Phoenix Force, though, Jean was strong enough to reject the power of the Death Seed and displaced it. After everything died down, Weapon Omega emerged from the rubble as Logan once again, his mind now clear of the corrupting force of the Death Seed. Unknown to him or Jean, however, the energies of the seed had in fact been contained by Bolivar Trask in a giant machine under the Nevada Desert.

"X-Termination"
In March 2013, the X-Treme X-Men, Age of Apocalypse, and Astonishing X-Men titles were part of the "X-Termination" crossover event, which focused on the AoA Nightcrawler's trip home. Age of Apocalypse #14, the final issue of the series, will be Part 3 of the event.

Following the completion of his quest, Nightcrawler decided it was time to return home. Even though this world was in a much better state, he still missed his own and he wanted to return to fight Weapon Omega. After managing to avoid Wolverine, who was hunting him down, Nightcrawler eventually tracked down another exile from his world: Dark Beast, however, unbeknownst to them, due to the dimension-hopping activities of various superheroes and villains, the walls in the netherspace have become weak and began to crack.

The rift first became known on Earth-TRN262 in the head of the Sphinx. Lord Xavier, the Witch King, Nazi Xavier, and Xavier Head began sacrificing civilians to an interdimensional rift to gain power. The X-treme X-Men, who had been trying to stop this from happening by killing ten evil Xaviers across various realities before they could use their powers to trigger the event, were able to rescue their Xavier and narrowly defeated Lord Xavier and Nazi Xavier. Unfortunately, the X-treme X-Men did not act quickly enough to save that world, and were forced to make an interdimensional jump, leaving that reality and all its citizens being consumed by the vortex. Unbeknownst to them, an army of monsters were waiting on the other side of the portal.

Using a pair of modified goggles, which Dark Beast explains will allow them to enter the Dreaming Celestial safely in a bid to return home. Kurt teleports them inside, where McCoy attempts to open a portal to their home reality. However, before the portal stabilizes, the machine he was using begins to malfunction. Before he can fix it, the X-Men arrive and the two have to flee, with Nightcrawler teleporting them through the portal. However, once they arrive in their homeworld, the portal doesn't close behind them, which worries the Dark Beast. The situation is complicated first by Wolverine's team, which comes through the portal to take Kurt back to their reality, and then by Dazzler and her team of X-treme X-Men, who seem keen to close the portal. As Xavier of the X-treme X-Men uses his powers to try and close the portal three huge monsters emerge from it. Xavier tries to tell them they mean no harm but one of the monsters kills him and dissolves his body to absorb its energy. As it does so, it grows slightly bigger.

In response, Dazzler blasts one with her light beams, but it absorbs her energy and grows in size. After trying various methods of attack, the teams realize that the monsters are nearly invulnerable. Karma tries possessing one but it ends up possessing her. They find out that the monsters were trapped between dimensions by the Celestials and that the constant travelling between worlds has weakened the barriers and freed them. Karma is dying but Iceman freezes the monsters and saves Karma. As the teams regroup to try and figure out what to do, Sage picks up on some thought the monsters are projecting. She screams for someone to shut the portal down, but it's too late and one of the monsters walks through it to the 616 universe. As Howlett, Wolverine, Northstar and Hercules go after it, the second monster heads off into New Apocalypse, whilst the third starts to drain energy from the portal itself. Prophet says that they could use the power of Apocalypse to defeat them but Jean Grey isn't so keen. After some deliberation, the teams decide to split up with some staying on New Apocalypse and the other going to fight the creature through the portal. Sabretooth and Horror Show sacrifice themselves to provide a distraction whilst Kid Nightcrawler teleports a group of people through the portal. The remaining group in New Apocalypse heads off to formulate a plan of attack as the second monster tears through the city.

Northstar, Hercules, Howlett and Wolverine emerge in San Francisco of the 616 universe, where they find the monster draining the energy from the Dreaming Celestial's chest. In the Age of Apocalypse reality, Jean and her group travel to the Apocalypse power. Fiend radios through from New Apocalypse, where one of the monsters is attacking. After a short conversation, the radio goes silent and Jean realizes her friend is dead. They make their way through some caverns to the room the Apocalypse power is being kept in. Dark Beast slips away as the others look at the canister the power resides in. Jean has Kurt teleport them both away as she doesn't trust anyone else. In the 616 universe, Howlett and Wolverine try attacking the monster but it just continues attacking the Celestial. Northstar throws Hercules at it and the monster is finally ripped away from it. Wolverine and Howlett are severely injured, so Kid Nightcrawler starts to teleport them away as Hercules continues to fight the monster. The monster kills him before Kurt can get to him in time. The monster then advances on the Celestial again, which decides to leave. However, the monster uses a grappling hook to prevent it from doing so and, even though the rest of the team manages to separate the two, the monster begins to absorb the energy from the Celestial. The team can only watch as the monster kills the Dreaming Celestial and absorbs all of its energy, continuing to grow in size and power. In the AoA reality, Jean tells Kurt the plan is for her to use the Apocalypse power herself, as she managed to use the Phoenix Force and resist it. Before she can, though, Dark Beast snatches the canister off her just as one of the monsters finds them and attacks.

As Howlett mourns the death of Hercules, the monster in 616 becomes stronger, due to the Celestial it just destroyed. Northstar creates a vortex around it to stop it being empowered by more energy, whilst Prophet tries to figure out how to kill it. He finds out that billions more monsters are headed to where this one is and, if they don't destroy this one, the whole world is doomed. In New Apocalypse on the other side of the portal, Jean is being chased by another monster. Dazzler and her team slow it down and Kurt teleports Prophet and Howlett through the portal. They see Dark Beast trying to take the power of the Apocalypse seed for himself. Nightcrawler and Jean try to take the seed off him but he fights back. Another monster enters and grabs the seed but is hurt by its touch. Dark Beast grabs the seed again and runs off with Jean and Nightcrawler chasing him. Prophet realizes that the monster was hurt by the seed. Kid Nightcrawler tells Dazzler her world is in danger too and Prophet says they have to close the portal and sacrifice one world. Dazzler refuses to do that and comes up with a plan. Whilst the others chase down Jean and the seed, Dazzler and Cyclops head to the portal. They use their powers to try and draw the monster through but it doesn't go for it. Kid Nightcrawler finds them and decides he can do it. He teleports to the monster and then teleports it through the portal. The strain of doing it was too much for him, though, and he dies in Dazzler's arms. Nightcrawler, Prophet, Howlett and Dark Beast teleport in. Dark Beast won't let go of the seed, so Dazzler confronts him, beats him up and takes the seed. She then hands it over to Jean Grey, so they can have her use it on the three monsters at the same time.

Jean Grey has taken in the power of Apocalypse and has been transformed into an immensely powerful being. Though she still holds on to her personality, the death powers are already corrupting her. As the monsters feed off the energy from the portal, Jean engages them in combat, blasting them away and drawing their attention. Howlett mourns the death of Kid Nightcrawler, causing AoA Nightcrawler to face up to what he has done. Prophet tells him to stop pitying himself and says they need Sage and the Celestial black box from the other universe. Nightcrawler teleports through the portal and on his way he sees billions of other monsters descends upon the portal. In the 616 universe, Wolverine and Northstar are arguing about what to do. Sage manages to connect her mind to the black box and sees the origin of the monsters. The Celestials created life because they were lonely. They decided to create death as well, so they formed the monsters. However, the monsters turned against the Celestials who couldn't kill them so they separated the universe into the Multiverse and bond them in the walls that separated all realities. The constant traveling between universes weakened the walls and allowed the monsters to escape again. Suddenly, Nightcrawler appears and take Sage back with him. In New Apocalypse, Jean is fighting the monsters but more continue to come through the portal. Slowly, the death seed starts to take her over more and she begins to lose herself. As the carnage spreads, Sage and Nightcrawler appear and Sage tells Prophet she knows what to do. He already knows, though. The monsters need a prison and this universe is the best choice. Dazzler tries to tell him there must be another way but he says there isn't. They need to get everyone they can back to her world and then close off the portal. Nightcrawler says he can do both.
 
As Jean continues to fight the monsters in New Apocalypse, Prophet orders everyone to evacuate to the 616 reality. Dazzler objects to leaving, but Prophet tells her sacrificing the AoA reality is the only way. Nightcrawler begins to teleport everyone back, first taking Harper Simmons and then Sage. However, when he goes to take Iceman, the Dark Beast breaks free of his shackles and goes with them. He is quickly knocked out by Gambit on the other side, but not before jamming a nugget of the Apocalypse seed within Iceman to keep it safe. As Nightcrawler next takes Howlett and Cyclops, Dazzler begs Prophet to come with her but he refuses, saying a captain goes down with the ship. However, the decision is made for him when Jean Grey knocks him out and instructs Dazzler to take him back to her world. Jean goes off to continue her fight as Nightcrawler teleports Dazzler and Prophet away. In the 616 reality, Nightcrawler realizes that if he grabs onto the black swirls in the portal, he can teleport the opening back in on itself. Sage confirms he could close the portal and, before anyone can stop him, he goes. He manages to close it at the cost of his own life and separate the entirety of Earth-295 from the Multiverse. Afterwards, Howlett and Cyclops decide to travel to Greece to collect Hercules from the underworld. Wolverine offers Dazzler a job at the school but she declines, as she needs a bit of time to herself. A few weeks later, Harper meets Prophet on a beach, where they have a drink to remember their old team. Elsewhere, Dazzler creates a holographic image to make sure everyone remembers her fallen teammates.

What If

Synopsis for "What If... The Age of Apocalypse Had Not Ended?"
An alternate AoA reality was presented when Magneto, giving up on Bishop's mission in the final moments, rescued his family from the nuclear explosions alongside some of his allies. Magneto, Rogue, Sunfire, Quicksilver, and Weapon X found themselves working with the last remaining human heroes (including Tony Stark, Invisible Woman and Gwen Stacy, the latter of which formed a romance with Quicksilver) to deal with a new threat: the Coming of Galactus.
 
As there was no Fantastic Four, it fell to the survivors to work against Galactus and his herald, the Silver Surfer. As the heroes sprung into action, Night-Thrasher ended up using advanced technology to empower himself with amazing psychic powers. Together, they were able to do the impossible and claim victory. After Weapon X used his adamantium claws to slay the Silver Surfer, the collective psychic potential of humanity was focused against Galactus, eventually killing him.

Secret Wars (2015)
The Age of Apocalypse is featured as one of the many domains of Battleworld in Secret Wars. It has its differences from the only
original storyline, with two of the main ones being the inclusion of Cypher as a prominent character and Magneto marrying Marvel Girl aka Emma Frost instead of Rogue. The Age of Apocalypse's location on Battleworld is known as the Domain of Apocalypse, the most ruthless domain of all.

X-Men Disassembled
During a battle with Nate Grey, Legion tries to send him back to his universe, however, things don't go as Legion planned and instead he ended banishing not only X-Man, but Armor, Pixie, Glob, Rockslide and himself to the Age of Apocalypse universe that exists on Legion's mindscape.

Collected editions

In other media
 The 2001 Game Boy Advance video game X-Men: Reign of Apocalypse is based loosely on the Age of Apocalypse storyline. In this version, the X-Men (consisting of Cyclops, Storm, Rogue, and Wolverine) accidentally travels to an alternate universe where Apocalypse has taken over the world and most of the X-Men have turned into his henchmen. It is later revealed that Apocalypse plans to travel to the regular timeline and take it over as well. In the end, the X-Men defeats Apocalypse and returns to their timeline.
 X-Men Legends II: Rise of Apocalypse is heavily influenced by the Age of Apocalypse storyline, including several characters and concepts from the storyline.
 Wolverine and the X-Men season 2's main storyline and setting was originally supposed to be the Age of Apocalypse, but the series was cancelled before production of the second season could begin.
 In X-Men: The Animated Series, there is an episode, "ONE MAN'S WORTH" (1995) whose story line directly inspired the Age of Apocalypse event.
 Marvel: Avengers Alliance featured a special operations titled Apocalypse based on the Age of Apocalypse storyline.
 Marvel Future Fight features a level based on the Age of Apocalypse event. Features an alternate costume for Magneto, Wolverine, Apocalypse, Beast, Rogue and Cyclops based on his Age of Apocalation incarnations.
Marvel Ultimate Alliance 3: The Black Order features an alternate costume for Colossus based on his Age of Apocalypse incarnation.
The film X-Men: Apocalypse is based on Age of Apocalypse.

References

External links
 UncannyXmen.Net's look at the Age of Apocalypse
 Age of Apocalypse summary
 It Only Hurts When I Sing: The Age of Apocalypse Resource Center
 Age of Apocalypse at Marvel Wikia 

Comics by Fabian Nicieza
Comics by Mark Waid
Marvel Comics dimensions
Comics about multiple time paths
Comics about time travel
Dystopian comics